Rear Admiral William Willmott Henderson, CB, KH (1788–1854) was a Royal Navy officer who became Commander-in-Chief, South East Coast of America Station.

Naval career
Henderson joined the Royal Navy in May 1799. Promoted to captain on 9 October 1815, he became commanding officer of the third-rate  in July 1837 and saw action in operations off the coast of Syria in 1840 during the Egyptian–Ottoman War. He died at sea in 1854.

References

1788 births
1854 deaths
Royal Navy rear admirals
Companions of the Order of the Bath
People who died at sea